Krisztián Tóth (born 1 May 1994) is a Hungarian judoka. He won one of the bronze medals in the men's 90 kg event at the 2020 Summer Olympics in Tokyo, Japan.

He competed at the 2016 Summer Olympics in Rio de Janeiro, in the men's 90 kg.

References

External links
 
 
 

1994 births
Living people
Hungarian male judoka
Olympic judoka of Hungary
Judoka at the 2016 Summer Olympics
Judoka at the 2010 Summer Youth Olympics
Sportspeople from Darmstadt
European Games competitors for Hungary
Judoka at the 2015 European Games
Judoka at the 2019 European Games
Olympic bronze medalists for Hungary
Olympic medalists in judo
Medalists at the 2020 Summer Olympics
Judoka at the 2020 Summer Olympics
21st-century Hungarian people